Franz Friedrich Franck, born at Augsburg in 1627, was instructed by his father, Hans Ulrich Franck. He died at Augsburg in 1687. The following productions are by him:

Augsburg. St. Anna. The History of Jacob and Esau.
Carlsruhe. Ducal Pal. The Passage of the Red Sea.
Mannheim. Gallery. The Israelites after the Passage through the Red Sea, and A Saloon of Pictures and Antiquities.
Ratisbon. Cathedral. St. Francis dying.
Vienna. Gallery. Portrait of a Man.

References
 

1627 births
1687 deaths
Artists from Augsburg
17th-century German painters
German male painters